The squeaky wheel gets the grease is an American proverb or metaphor used to convey the idea that the most noticeable (or loudest) problems are the ones most likely to get attention.  It is also expressed as "The squeaky wheel gets the oil".  Other variations exist, and suggest that loudness gets attention, and prolongs the life of the hub. 
Conversely, a silent hub may be overlooked and neglected.  And there is no necessary correlation between loudness and stridency and merit.

History
The origin of the squeaky wheel metaphor is unknown, but its current form is attributed to American humorist Josh Billings who is said to have popularized it in his putative poem "The Kicker" (c. 1870)I hate to be a kicker,
I always long for peace,
But the wheel that squeaks the loudest,
Is the one that gets the grease.

However, this poem has been attributed to various authors, anonymous or otherwise, and its provenance has never been verified.  The first publication of the poem can be traced only to 1910.  For unknown reasons, in 1937 Bartlett's Familiar Quotations attributed the poem to Henry Wheeler Shaw, whose pen name was Josh Billings.

Cultural differences
Culturally, the adage contrasts with that of the Japanese proverb, "The stake that sticks up gets hammered down", or "The nail that stands out gets pounded down," (出る釘は打たれる, deru kugi wa utareru), or the Dutch proverbs "Tall trees catch loads of wind" ("Hoge bomen vangen veel wind", implying they are the first to go down) and "[The wheat that's growing] above the mowing line [gets cut down]" ("[Koren dat] boven het maaiveld uitsteekt [wordt afgehakt]"). Similarly, one of the Chinese proverbs goes "会哭的孩子有奶吃", which means "The crying baby gets the milk" and Korean one "모난 돌이 정 맞는다: Pointy stone meets chisel." while German and Spanish proverbs go "Das Rad, das am lautesten quietscht, bekommt das meiste Fett: The wheel that squeaks the loudest gets most of the grease." and "El que no llora no mama: He who does not cry does not get breastfed." However, a sentiment similar to the Japanese focus on modesty and humility is also reflected in the idea of tall poppy syndrome, which is popular in commonwealth countries, and the Law of Jante in Scandinavia.

As a fallacy
Decisions and conclusions made on the basis of "the squeaky wheel gets the grease" may be reached fallaciously if one assumes a problem will out itself with contrary evidence rather than finding positive evidence to support a conclusion.  Sreenivasan & Narayana (2008) identify the squeaky wheel fallacy as a fallacy to avoid during "problem formulation, analysis, interpretation and action" in the continual improvement process:

This fallacy operates on the principle that [the] squeaky wheel gets the grease. If something is wrong with a conclusion it will 'squeak'.  If we do not hear any complaints from the shop one can assure that the change adopted is OK.  In experimental work, this fallacy arises when decisions are based on the absence of contrary evidence rather than the presence of supporting evidence...The cure for this fallacy lies in reaching conclusions based on the presence of positive supporting evidence rather than lack of contrary evidence.

The squeaky wheel saying can also be misinterpreted as to Keep at it or be persistent or don't give up, being used as an encouraging statement.

Notes

References

.

American English idioms
Relevance fallacies